The Republic of Angola and the Democratic Republic of the Congo share a 2,646 km (1,644 m) border.

Historically, Angola has been closely involved in Congolese politics, taking part in the 1997 war to oust Mobutu Sese Seko from power. It then intervened during the Second Congo War in 1998 on the side of the new administration under Laurent-Désiré Kabila. Since the end of the conflict, the Angolan government remained an ally of President Joseph Kabila and supported him militarily. However, Angola's focus on  stability in the DRC, compared to Kabila's attempts to remain in power and postponement of elections since the end of his term in December 2016, leading to mass protests, have led to a cooling in relations between the two countries.

Since 2003, Angola has regularly conducted mass expulsions of irregular Congolese immigrants. In 2012, Human Rights Watch reported upon the "degrading and inhuman treatment", including sexual violence, of Congolese migrants during state-sanctioned expulsions. These claims centred on expulsions from the Angolan provinces of Cabinda and Lunda Norte to the Congolese provinces of Kongo Central and Kasaï-Occidental. 

About 30,000 Congolese refugees fleeing from violence in the Kasaï-Central region of the DRC due to the Kamwina Nsapu rebellion that began in August 2016 entered Angola. By late 2017, several thousand returned to Congo. In October 2018, about 300,000 Congolese fled Angola, many of them in response to violence in the mining town Lucapa; DRC's foreign minister Léonard She Okitundu summoned Angola's ambassador over the expulsion, demanding a “comprehensive investigation to establish who is responsible for these wrongful acts”.

See also
Foreign relations of Angola 
Foreign relations of the Democratic Republic of the Congo
Mundindi Didi Kilengo

References

 
Congo, Democratic Republic of
Bilateral relations of the Democratic Republic of the Congo